UFC Fight Night: Shogun vs. Henderson 2 (also known as UFC Fight Night 38) was a mixed martial arts event held on March 23, 2014, at the Ginásio Nélio Dias in Natal, Brazil.

Background
The event was headlined by the anticipated rematch between mixed martial arts legends Maurício Rua and Dan Henderson. Henderson won their first encounter back in November 2011 at UFC 139 via unanimous decision in a bout lauded by many MMA pundits as the Fight of the Year for 2011 and one of the best bouts in the history of the UFC.

The co-main event featured a long-planned bout between Cezar Ferreira and C. B. Dollaway. The two were originally scheduled to meet on May 18, 2013 at UFC on FX 8. However, both Dollaway  and Ferreira had been forced from the bout due to injury.

Gleison Tibau was expected to face Mairbek Taisumov at the event. However, Tibau pulled out of the bout citing injury and was replaced by Michel Prazeres.

Diego Brandao was expected to face Will Chope at the event and both men weighed in successfully on March 22 for the fight.  However, after the weigh ins, the bout was cancelled when documents were released that showed Chope assaulted and threatened his ex-wife, which led to jail time and a dishonorable discharge from the U.S. Air Force.

At the weigh-ins, Ronny Markes weighed in at 190 pounds, 4 pounds over the middleweight non-title fight limit. His bout proceeded at catchweight and he was fined 20% of his purse, which went to his opponent Thiago Santos.

The card saw an average of 936,000 viewers with a peak of 1.25 million during the main event.

Results

Bonus awards
The following fighters were awarded $50,000 bonuses:
 Fight of the Night: Maurício Rua vs. Dan Henderson
 Performance of the Night: Dan Henderson and Godofredo Pepey

See also
List of UFC events
2014 in UFC

References

UFC Fight Night
Mixed martial arts in Brazil
Sport in Rio Grande do Norte
2014 in mixed martial arts